The X KXRX is a modern rock public radio station playing a mix of new and old music online via Winamp, RealAudio, Windows Media Player, and QuickTime. The station is based in Seattle, Washington and is owned by the Radio Domination Streaming Network (RDSN) and Rockstar Multimedia.

History
According to the SeaTac Radio Blog, The X derived its name in homage to the now silent KXRX 96.5 FM Seattle which debuted January 5, 1987 with the largest entry level ratings share in Seattle market history.

KXRX's relatively short tenure in the Seattle market was a momentous one, with "The X" establishing itself as one of the first major radio stations to play "grunge," a wave of popular music originating in the Pacific Northwest and soon spanning the globe. The station helped launch the careers of groups such as Nirvana, Pearl Jam, Soundgarden and Alice in Chains, and featured a high-profile corps of deejays that included Mike West, Robin Erickson, John Maynard, and British-born Norman B. (Batley), who introduced listeners to "Seattle Blues," a Sunday night show that drew a large and devoted following.

Bart Becker of The Seattle Weekly wrote that Norman B. Was "stirring up the Sunday night radio waves" and "breaking the sound barrier." Prompted by the success of "Seattle Blues," KXRX unveiled a new weekly new music show hosted by Norman B. called, "The Xtra Hour."

After seven years of "feisty, personality-oriented album rock," KXRX was sold by Shamrock Broadcasting to Alliance Broadcasting.

Streaming
Streaming costs are subsidized by private donations and Rockstar Multimedia in an effort to keep The X as commercial free as fiscally possible. Technology services such as the web site and related IT services have been provided through a strategic partnership with PacWest Media.

Programs
For the bulk of its schedule KXRX (The X) broadcasts a commercial free mix from a variety of rock genres which include Alternative, Classic, Indie, Modern, and Metal. The station also offers several content driven shows.

The Marty Riemer Show
The Marty Riemer Show hosted by Marty Riemer & Jodi Brothers who have worked at KMTT, KZOK, KJR-FM, KROK, and KNDD. Marty may be best known for being the first person to report the death of Nirvana's Kurt Cobain when he worked at KXRX-FM in the 1990s. Beau Roberts was on air with Marty, the day the story broke.

DubRRadio Show
DubRRadio Show hosted by Rick "Double R" Robertson who has worked for WNEW-FM, WQHT, KQBZ, and KISW where he became well known for several outrageous on air stunts one of which left him with a WNBA Seattle Storm logo tattoo on his butt.

The Big Rock Show
The Big Rock Show hosted by Tina Peek one of the rock music journalists in the country, each week Tina brings in musicians and other industry types to chat about everything music.

Green Jellÿ
The band Green Jellÿ owes its big break to The X KXRX. The station in Seattle, Washington, played "Three Little Pigs" as a joke, but instead the station's phones lit up and it became a local hit. This caused Zoo to issue the EP Green Jellö SUXX, consisting of four songs from Cereal Killer, which in turn led to "Three Little Pigs" becoming a hit on The Box (A pay-per-play cable-TV jukebox network). By early 1993, the song was gaining airplay around the country, and after appearing on MTV Headbanger's Ball, everything exploded. MTV added the video and the full-length audio album Cereal Killer Soundtrack was finally released in April 1993.

References

X